Parity of esteem is a concept which can be applied in a variety of contexts.

As a political philosophy
Parity of esteem can be used to establish a theory to overcome inter-communal conflict. Promoters of the theory argue that parity of esteem "offers a language for negotiation of a post-conflict equilibrium". This negotiation begins with the communities recognising the stalemate of their position. Rather than continue trying to out-do each other, the communities should attempt to negotiate a peaceful coexistence in a shared physical space despite their cultural differences.

Parity of esteem can be described as a post-Enlightenment theory as it differs drastically from classical liberal or Marxist rationalism and is contrary to 20th-century ideas of "self-determination" or the 19th-century idea of the nation-state. Many of these anticipated a "withering away of nationalism" once minorities were brought within the nation-state. These concepts are today the most dominant within contemporary political theory. As Ernest Gellner writes, "the idea that political boundaries must be congruent with ethnic ones, that rulers must not be ethnically distinguishable from the ruled now has a salience and authority which it has never possessed in the previous history of mankind". Where Enlightenment theories addressed issues of inter-communal conflict, it did so either by promoting "non-sectarianism" against "tribalism" (liberalism) or emphasising "class politics" against "bourgeois nationalism" (Marxism). Neither of these approaches recognised the traditions of belligerents in inter-communal conflicts. Parity of esteem on the other hand can accepts various nationalist traditions within one state.

Interest in parity of esteem approaches emerged during the mid-1980s and accelerated following the fall of the Berlin Wall and the Yugoslav wars of the early 1990s. It was recognised that while there were 184 independent states, there were more than 600 living language groups and more than 5,000 ethnic groups. Simply put, without enough geo-political space, slogans such as the Serb nationalist claim for "All Serbs in One State" were simply unworkable. Since the end of the 1990s, Parity of esteem is a core concept to the Northern Ireland peace process.

Health care
Parity of esteem for mental health is an issue for many healthcare systems because of the pervasive stigma of mental illness. People with diagnosed mental illness die on average around 20 years earlier than those without such a diagnosis, some because of suicide, but mostly because of poorly treated physical illness. Mental illness has been assessed as constituting around a quarter of the disease burden in developed countries.  There is much bigger treatment gap for mental illness than for physical illness.  

In the USA legislation was enacted in 2006 which attempted to achieve equality in health insurance coverage between surgical treatment and mental health treatments. 

In the UK Norman Lamb campaigned for mental health to be given parity of esteem with physical health.   The Royal College of Psychiatrists proposed that parity of esteem should be defined as "Valuing mental health equally with physical health". In practice most arguments have been centred on levels of funding.  Expenditure on mental health services provided by NHS trusts fell by around 8.25% between 2010 and 2015.  According to Dr Phil Moore chair of the Mental Health Commissioners Network at NHS Clinical Commissioners discussions in 2016 had degenerated into a funding dispute.  He wanted to see discussions about the degree to which mental health is embedded into other services, including the integration of psychological services with general practice

It has also been raised as an issue when comparing pay and conditions in healthcare with social care, where pay is generally much lower.

References 
 Tom Hennessey and Robin Wilson, 1997, With All Due Respect: Pluralism and Parity of Esteem, Democratic Dialogue, 

Political theories
Mental health
Discrimination